is a railway station in Kanzaki, Saga Prefecture, Japan. It is operated by JR Kyushu and is on the Nagasaki Main Line.

Lines

Station layout 
The station consists of a side and an island platform serving three tracks. The station building is a modern design built of steel and glass and is a hashigami structure  where the passenger facilities such as the ticket window and waiting area are housed in a bridge which spans the tracks. From the station forecourt on the south side of the tracks, there is, in addition to steps, a ramp which leads to an elevator which gives access to the facilities on the bridge. Besides a flight of steps, the island platform is also served by an elevator from the bridge. Platform 1 (the side platform) is not served by an elevator but there is a direct entrance from station forecourt which staff can open for wheelchair users. It is also possible to enter the station bridge structure from the north side of the tracks using steps or an elevator.

Management of the station has been outsourced to the JR Kyushu Tetsudou Eigyou Co., a wholly owned subsidiary of JR Kyushu specialising in station services. It staffs the ticket window which is equipped with a POS machine but does not have a Midori no Madoguchi facility.

Adjacent stations

History
When the Kyushu Railway was nationalized on 1 July 1907, Japanese Government Railways (JGR) took over control of the station. On 12 October 1909, the station became part of the Nagasaki Main Line. With the privatization of Japanese National Railways (JNR), the successor of JGR, on 1 April 1987, control of the station passed to JR Kyushu and JR Freight. Freight services were discontinued on 22 May 1997.

Passenger statistics
In fiscal 2016, the station was used by an average of 1,616 passengers daily (boarding passengers only), and it ranked 112th among the busiest stations of JR Kyushu.

Environs
Kanzaki City Hall
Saga Prefectural Kanzaki High School
National Route 34
Kanzaki Junior High School
Yoshinogari Ruins
Kanzaki Onsen

See also
 List of railway stations in Japan

References

External links
Kanzaki Station (JR Kyushu)

Nagasaki Main Line
Railway stations in Saga Prefecture
Railway stations in Japan opened in 1891